Kızılaliler is a village in Anamur district of Mersin Province, Turkey. The village is situated on the lower slopes of the Toros Mountains. The population of the village is 886 as of 2011.

There are Roman ruins at the north west of the village and there are ruins of a 6th-century (Byzantine) basilica so called Kızıl kilise ("Red church") in the village.

References

Villages in Anamur District